Darling and Pearson was an architectural firm based in Toronto from 1895 through 1937. The firm was prolific and produced consistently fine work though the patronage of notable figures of the Canadian establishment, and is responsible for enhancing the architectural character and quality of the city, and indeed the rest of Canada, in the first quarter of the 20th century.

Formation
The firm was organized first as Darling, Curry, Sproatt, & Pearson in 1892, with partners Frank Darling, S. George Curry, Henry Sproatt, and John A. Pearson.  From 1893 through 1896 it evolved into Darling, Sproatt & Pearson, then finally Darling and Pearson was founded as such in 1897.

Its heyday began with Darling's commissions from the Canadian Bank of Commerce in 1898, grand Edwardian buildings in Toronto, Winnipeg, Montreal, and Vancouver, and dozens of smaller branches in smaller Canadian cities and towns.  Darling's training with the English architect George Edmund Street and Sir Arthur Blomfield in the early 1870s brought a serious, substantial, Victorian influence, well-suited to large civic and institutional projects in the years of the nation's development.

Their subsequent projects included the first tall steel-frame building in Canada (the Royal Tower in Winnipeg, 1904), the tallest building in Canada for three decades (the 1930 Canadian Bank of Commerce Building in Toronto, with York and Sawyer of New York), and the largest single building in the British Commonwealth (the Sun Life Building, Montreal, Started in 1914 and tower added by1931).

Legacy

After the deaths of Frank Darling in 1923 and Pearson in 1940, the firm was renamed Darling, Pearson and Cleveland with Darling's nephew as a partner.

Darling and Pearson 

 Alpha Delta Phi Toronto Chapter House, 1894. Originally known as the Ince house
 Masaryk-Cowan Community Recreation Centre, 1898. Originally a curling rink
 University of Toronto Faculty of Law, Flavelle House, 1901
 Union Bank Building, 500 Main Street, Winnipeg, with the George A. Fuller Co., 1904
 197 Yonge Street, Toronto, 1905 - renovated former banking building
 Canadian Bank of Commerce, Watson, Saskatchewan, 1906
 Convocation Hall, University of Toronto, 1906
 Moose Jaw Court House, Moose Jaw, Saskatchewan 1908
 Old Canadian Bank of Commerce Building, Montreal, 1906–09
 University of Toronto Sanford Fleming Building and Sigmund Samuel Building, 1907, and additions to the latter in 1912
 The Church of St. Mary Magdalene, 1908
 Grain Exchange Building - 167 Lombard Street, Winnipeg, 1906-1908
 Toronto General Hospital, College Wing, now the MaRS Discovery District building, 1911
 Canadian Pacific Building, Toronto, for a time the tallest building in Canada, 1913
 One King Street West, Toronto, 1914
 Royal Ontario Museum original building (west wing - Italianate-Neo-Romanesque), 1914
 Parkwood Estate, 1916
 North Toronto railway station of the Canadian Pacific Railway 1916
 Art Gallery of Ontario original building, 1916
 MaRS Discovery District - old Toronto General Hospital College Street wing - 101 College Street, Toronto, 1919
 Varsity Arena, Toronto, 1926
 Private Patients Pavilion (Thomas J. Bell Wing), Toronto General Hospital, 1930
 Canadian Bank of Commerce Building in Toronto; now Commerce Court North, 1930
 Canadian General Electric Building, 212 King Street West, Toronto, 1908

Darling, Pearson and Cleveland 
 Sun Life Building, Montreal, 1931
 expansions to the Art Gallery of Ontario, 1935

Images

References

External links
 Bell Wing (TGH)
 emporis list of commissions

Architecture firms of Canada
Companies based in Toronto
Defunct companies of Ontario